The Arkansas Wildcats are a team of the Women's Football Alliance which began play for the 2011 season.  Based in Little Rock, Arkansas the Wildcats played their home games on the campus of Little Rock Central High School.

In 2011 and 2013, the Wildcats were known as the Little Rock Wildcats.

Season-By-Season

|-
|2011 || 3 || 5 || 0 || 2nd American Southeast || --
|-
|2012 || 5 || 4 || 0 || 1st American South Central || Lost American Conference Wild Card (Lone Star)
|-
|2013 || 5 || 4 || 0 || 1st American Gulf Coast || Lost American Conference Wild Card (Austin)
|-
|2015 || 2 || 6 || 0 || 3rd American Gulf Coast || --
|-
|2016 || 0 || 0 || 0 || inactive || --
|-
|2017 || 6 || 2 || 0 || 3rd American South West || Won Div. III American Conference Semifinal (Austin)Won Div. III American Conference Final (S. Oregon)Won Div. III National Championship (Orlando)
|-
!Totals || 15 || 19 || 0 ||  ||

2011

Standings

Season schedule

** = Won by forfeit

2012

Season schedule

References

Arkansas Wildcats official website
Women's Football Alliance

Women's Football Alliance teams
Sports in Little Rock, Arkansas
American football teams in Arkansas
American football teams established in 2011
2011 establishments in Arkansas
Women's sports in Arkansas